Deon Cain (born August 9, 1996) is an American football wide receiver for the Birmingham Stallions of the United States Football League (USFL). He played college football at Clemson.

Early years
Cain attended Tampa Bay Technical High School in Tampa, Florida. He played quarterback for the high school football team. He was rated as a five-star recruit and committed to Clemson University to play college football under head coach Dabo Swinney.

College career
Cain moved to wide receiver at Clemson. As a true freshman in 2015, he played in 13 games, recording 34 receptions for 582 yards and five touchdowns. He did not play in the 2015 Orange Bowl or 2016 College Football Playoff National Championship due to suspension for failing a drug test. Cain returned from the suspension in 2016, and played in all 15 games, including Clemson's 2017 College Football Playoff National Championship victory over Alabama. For the season, he had 38 receptions for 724 yards and nine touchdowns.  After his junior season, Cain decided to forgo his senior year and declare for the 2018 NFL Draft.

Professional career

Indianapolis Colts
Cain was drafted by the Indianapolis Colts in the sixth round (185th overall) of the 2018 NFL Draft. In the first preseason game, Cain suffered a torn ACL after a promising training camp, prematurely ending his rookie season. Cain was placed on injured reserve on August 12, 2018. He made his NFL debut in the Colts' 2019 season opener against the Los Angeles Chargers. In the 30–24 loss, he had two receptions for 35 yards. He was waived on November 9.

Pittsburgh Steelers
On November 16, 2019, Cain was signed off the Colts practice squad by the Pittsburgh Steelers. In 6 games with the Steelers, Cain caught 5 passes for 72 yards.

He was waived on September 5, 2020, and was signed to the practice squad the next day. He was elevated to the active roster on October 17 and January 2, 2021, for the team's weeks 6 and 17 games, each against the Cleveland Browns, and reverted to the practice squad after each game. His practice squad contract with the team expired after the season on January 18, 2021.

Baltimore Ravens
On January 22, 2021, Cain signed a reserve/futures contract with the Baltimore Ravens. On August 31, 2021, he was placed on injured reserve, and released three days later.

Philadelphia Eagles
On October 18, 2021, Cain was signed to the Philadelphia Eagles practice squad. He signed a reserve/future contract with the Eagles on January 18, 2022.

On August 30, 2022, Cain was waived by the Eagles and signed to the practice squad the next day. He was released on October 31, 2022.

On November 11, 2022, the Tennessee Titans hosted Cain for a workout.

Birmingham Stallions
On March 8, 2023, Cain signed with the Birmingham Stallions of the United States Football League (USFL).

NFL career statistics

References

External links
Indianapolis Colts bio
Clemson Tigers bio

1996 births
Living people
Players of American football from Tampa, Florida
American football wide receivers
Clemson Tigers football players
Indianapolis Colts players
Pittsburgh Steelers players
Baltimore Ravens players
Philadelphia Eagles players
Birmingham Stallions (2022) players